Ramon Paolo Vlajar Bugia (born January 19, 1981) is a Filipino former professional basketball player and executive who currently serves as the team manager for the Phoenix Super LPG Fuel Masters of the Philippine Basketball Association (PBA). He was drafted seventeenth overall by the Red Bull Barako in the 2005 PBA draft.

In February 2016, Bugia was appointed as the team manager for the newly formed PBA team Phoenix Fuel Masters.

College career
Bugia played for the Ateneo de Manila University, where he was a member of the college basketball team, the Blue Eagles. While at Ateneo, he became teammates with former UAAP MVP and future PBA teammate Rich Alvarez. He finished with a master's degree at business administration

In his final year in 2004 (Season 67), he was named part of the UAAP Men's Basketball Mythical 5 team.

Professional career
Bugia was drafted seventh overall by Red Bull in the 2005 PBA draft.

Bugia was waived by Red Bull, but was picked up and signed by Purefoods Tender Juicy Giants.

On August 2009, Bugia was traded by Purefoods to Barangay Ginebra Kings. Barangay Ginebra traded Paul Artadi, Rafi Reavis, and the rights to 2009 8th pick overall Chris Timberlake for Enrico Villanueva, Rich Alvarez, Celino Cruz, and Paolo Bugia of Purefoods. Burger King acted as the conduit team, trading Pocholo Villanueva to Ginebra and acquiring the rights to 2009 Rookie draft eighteenth pick Orlando Daroya and future picks. However, he did not play a single game with them.

He was signed by the Rain or Shine Elasto Painters during the off-season after being released by Ginebra. He played one conference with the Elasto Painters.
 
On January 20, he along with Sol Mercado were traded by Rain or Shine to the Meralco Bolts in exchange for Beau Belga as part of a three team deal that involved Meralco, Rain or Shine and Air21. However, he along with Hans Thiele were traded to the Alaska Aces for Reynel Hugnatan.

Career statistics

Season-by-season averages

|-
| align=left | 
| align=left | Red Bull
| 61 || 12.6 || .426 || .000 || .482 || 2.6 || .7 || .1 || .3 || 4.1

|-
| align=left | 
| align=left | Red Bull
| 47 || 11.2 || .315 || .000 || .625 || 2.0 || .3 || .1 || .3 || 3.0
|-
| align=left | 
| align=left | Red Bull
| 33 || 15.8 || .393 || .286 || .408 || 2.9 || .6 || .2 || .2 || 4.2
|-
| align=left | 
| align=left | Purefoods
| 12 || 8.5 || .441 || .250 || .571 || 1.8 || .0 || .1 || .2 || 2.9
|-
| align=left | 
| align=left | Alaska
| 15 || 5.6 || .371 || .000 || .500 || 1.1 || .3 || .0 || .5 || 2.0
|-
| align=left | 
| align=left | Alaska
| 13 || 6.9 || .452 || .000 || .571 || 1.2 || .2 || .0 || .0 || 2.5
|-
| align=left | 
| align=left | Alaska
| 4 || 3.8 || .500 || .000 || .500 || .8 || .3 || .0 || .0 || 1.3
|-
| align=left | 
| align=left | Alaska
| 2 || 5.0 || .286 || .000 || .000 || 2.0 || .0 || .0 || .0 || 2.0
|-
| align=left | 
| align=left | Alaska
| 6 || 7.5 || .357 || .000 || .750 || 2.0 || .2 || .0 || .0 || 2.2
|-
| align=left | Career
| align=left |
| 193 || 11.2 || .388 || .273 || .509 || 2.2 || .4 || .1 || .2 || 3.3

Post-playing career
In 2016, Bugia was appointed as the team manager for the new PBA team Phoenix Fuel Masters.

References

External links
 Player Profile at PBA-Online!
 Player Profile at PBA.Inquirer.net
 Player Profile at Asia-Basket.com
 
 

1981 births
Living people
Centers (basketball)
Filipino men's basketball players
Basketball players from Manila
Barako Bull Energy Boosters players
Magnolia Hotshots players
Ateneo Blue Eagles men's basketball players
Barako Bull Energy Boosters draft picks